Jason Kubler was the defending champion but chose not to compete this year.

Seeds

Draw

Finals

Top half

Bottom half

References
Main Draw
Qualifying Singles

Sibiu Open - Singles
Sibiu Open
2015 in Romanian tennis